Edward Worsfold Mowll (28 December 1881 – 12 June 1964) was an Anglican bishop, the fourth Bishop of Middleton.

Educated at The King's School, Canterbury and  Jesus College, Cambridge, he was ordained in 1905 and after a curacy at Leyton became secretary of the Church Pastoral-Aid Society. Incumbencies at Benwell, Southport  and Oxford followed, before he became Provost of Bradford Cathedral in 1933. Elevation to the Episcopate followed ten years later and he stayed in this, his final post, until retirement in 1951. A "kind and fatherly man", he died in 1964.

Family
Edward Worsfold Mowll was the fourth son of Edward Worsfold Mowll and his wife, Mary Kingsford. 
He married firstly Josephine Denham Gildea, eldest daughter of John Randolph Gildea of Weatherfort Hall Co. Mayo Ireland on the 5  June 1909 in St Marylebone Parish Church, London England.  Josephine died aged 30 in 1912.

He married secondly Margaret Cicely Skrine, daughter of Henry Mills Skrine and Mary Jane Gore-Langton and great-granddaughter of Victor Hope, 2nd Marquess of Linlithgow, on 4 August 1915 in Holy Trinity Church, Sloan Street, London. Margaret died on the 18th of Oct 1958. 
He married thirdly Alice Hone Kempson daughter of Edwin Hone Kempson and his wife, Beatrice Alice Garnett in 1959.

References

1881 births
People educated at The King's School, Canterbury
Alumni of Jesus College, Cambridge
Bishops of Middleton
20th-century Church of England bishops
1964 deaths
Provosts and Deans of Bradford